Marcin Nowak (born 17 October 1975) is a Polish volleyball player. He competed in the men's tournament at the 1996 Summer Olympics.

References

External links
 

1975 births
Living people
Sportspeople from Częstochowa
Polish men's volleyball players
Olympic volleyball players of Poland
Volleyball players at the 1996 Summer Olympics
AZS Częstochowa players
AZS Olsztyn players
ZAKSA Kędzierzyn-Koźle players
BKS Visła Bydgoszcz players
Projekt Warsaw players